Vytautas Vasiliauskas (born October 21, 1930) is a Lithuanian citizen who was a collaborator with the Soviet occupation regime and who worked with the Soviet Ministry of State Security. He was convicted of genocide for his role in the Soviet murder of Lithuanian resistance fighters.

In 2011 Vasiliauskas was found guilty by Kaunas Regional Court under Article 99 of the Lithuanian Criminal Code of the Soviet genocide committed in January 1953 of two Lithuanian partisans, and was sentenced to six years imprisonment. However, the European Court of Human Rights in a 9-to-8 decision overturned the conviction in October 2015.

References

1930 births
Living people
European Court of Human Rights cases involving Lithuania
KGB officers
People convicted of murder by Lithuania
Prisoners and detainees of Lithuania